KNDO (channel 23) is a television station in Yakima, Washington, United States, affiliated with NBC. It is owned by the Spokane-based Cowles Company as part of the KHQ Television Group. KNDO's studios are located on West Yakima Avenue in downtown Yakima, and its transmitter is located on Ahtanum Ridge.

KNDU (channel 25) in Richland operates as a semi-satellite of KNDO, serving the Tri-Cities area; this station maintains its own studios on West Kennewick Avenue in Kennewick. As a KNDO semi-satellite, it simulcasts all network and syndicated programming as provided through its parent, and the two stations share a website. However, KNDU airs separate commercial inserts and legal identifications. Local newscasts, produced by KNDU, are simulcast on both stations. KNDO serves the western half of the Yakima/Tri-Cities market while KNDU serves the eastern portion. The two stations are counted as a single unit for ratings purposes. Master control and some internal operations are based at the studios of sister station, fellow NBC affiliate and company flagship KHQ-TV on West Sprague Avenue in downtown Spokane.

On satellite, KNDO is only available on DirecTV, while Dish Network carries KNDU instead.

History
KNDO debuted on the air on October 15, 1959. It was owned by Hugh Davis and his Columbia Empire Broadcasting Corporation. Previously, all three networks had been shoehorned on primary CBS affiliate KIMA-TV (channel 29). Although conventional wisdom suggested that KNDO should have signed on as an NBC affiliate, it instead took on the ABC affiliation. This was very unusual for a two-station market, especially one as small as Yakima. During this time, it carried a secondary affiliation with NBC, and also aired a few CBS programs turned down by KIMA-TV, including The Andy Griffith Show. KNDU signed-on southward as a semi-satellite in 1961.

In 1965, KNDO became a primary NBC affiliate, but shared ABC with KIMA-TV until KAPP (channel 35) debuted in 1970 to take the ABC affiliation; since then, the station has been an exclusive NBC affiliate.

Davis sold the two stations to Farragut Communications in 1988. Federal Enterprises acquired KNDO and KNDU in 1995. Federal was bought out by Raycom Media in 1997. Current owner Cowles Company purchased the two stations from Raycom in July 1999.

On October 15, 2009, KNDO celebrated 50 years of broadcasting to the Yakima Valley. Leading up to that date, KNDO aired stories of local businesses and organizations that have also been around for 50 years or longer.

Programming
In addition to the NBC network schedule, syndicated programming on KNDO includes Hot Bench, The Drew Barrymore Show, Jeopardy!, and Wheel of Fortune, among others.

In the past the station pre-empted much of the NBC lineup post-Late Night, including Later and Friday Night Videos/Friday Night, along with the network's Nightside rolling news block, as the station carried syndicated programming, then continued to sign off the air nightly. It began to air all three programs in 1996, shortly after Federal took control of the station.

Notable former on-air staff
 Jamie Kern (now with IT Cosmetics)
 Whit Johnson (later with KNBC in Los Angeles, now with ABC News)
 Jim Snyder (1987–1989; now with KSNV in Las Vegas)
 Anish Shroff (now with ESPN)

Translator

Subchannels
The station's digital signal is multiplexed:

KNDO and KNDU have been digital-only since February 17, 2009. NBC Weather+ had been carried on digital subchannel 23.3; the originating national network ceased operation on December 1, 2008. On September 1, 2010, KNDO dropped Universal Sports (channel 23.2) from their subchannel line-up.

References

External links

SWX Right Now

NBC network affiliates
Cowles Company
Television channels and stations established in 1959
1959 establishments in Washington (state)
NDO